Stine Ballisager Pedersen (born 3 January 1994) is a Danish footballer who plays as a defender for Vålerenga in the Toppserien and the Denmark national team.

Club career
Pedersen started playing football at six years old. She played youth soccer for Vellev IF and then for Team Viborg. In 2012, Pedersen signed with IK Skovbakken.

International career
Pedersen played for several youth Danish national teams. In 2012, she debuted for Denmark Senior Team in a match against Brazil. She was also part of the team which represented Denmark at the UEFA Women's Euro 2017, where they reached the competition final for the first time in history, but eventually lost to the Netherlands.

International goals

References

External links
 Player's Profile at Danish Football Association (DBU)
 

1994 births
Living people
Danish women's footballers
VSK Aarhus (women) players
Women's association football defenders
Vålerenga Fotball Damer players
Danish expatriate women's footballers
Danish expatriate sportspeople in Norway
Expatriate women's footballers in Norway
UEFA Women's Euro 2022 players
Denmark women's international footballers
UEFA Women's Euro 2017 players